Tommy Rowlands (born June 3, 1981, in Columbus, Ohio) is a retired American wrestler.

Rowlands wrestled for The Ohio State University from 2001 to 2004.  During his career at Ohio State, he was a 2x NCAA Champion, 3x NCAA Finalist, 4x NCAA All-American, and 2x Big Ten Champion.  He is the career record holder at Ohio State for takedowns (705), wins (164), and team points (703).  Rowlands graduated from Bishop Ready High School in Columbus Ohio 1999.  He was a two-time Ohio state champion (1997–99) and the 1999 National High School champion with a career high school record of 167–10 with 98 pins.  He was also 2001 Big Ten freshman of the year.

Following graduation from Ohio State in 2004, Rowlands had a successful international wrestling career.  From 2004 to 2012, he was a University World Champion, Pan-Am Champion, 2x U.S. Open Champion, and 6x U.S. National Team Member.  Rowlands was narrowly defeated in the finals of the Olympic Trials in 2008 & 2012 and became one of the few 2x Olympic Alternates in American wrestling history.  He retired from competition following the 2012 Olympic Trials.

References
The Columbus Dispatch (Wed. 4/23/2008) Sports page article by Jim Massie
Ohio State Athletics Biography

The Columbus Dispatch (4/15/2012) Sports page article by Rob Oller
http://buckeyextra.dispatch.com/content/stories/2012/04/15/delayed-olympic-dream-keeps-wrestler-rowlands-on-mat-at-30.html#comment

iTunes - The T-Row & Funky Show
http://itunes.apple.com/us/podcast/the-t-row-funky-show/id1059934839

Living people
Ohio State Buckeyes wrestlers
Ohio State Buckeyes wrestling coaches
1981 births
Pan American Games silver medalists for the United States
Pan American Games medalists in wrestling
Wrestlers at the 2007 Pan American Games
American male sport wrestlers
Medalists at the 2007 Pan American Games